The 1946 Brooklyn Dodgers season was the first season for the Brooklyn Dodgers football team and also the inaugural season of the All-America Football Conference. The team compiled a 3–10–1 record.

In October 1945, team co-owners William D. Cox and Gerald Smith announced that the new Brooklyn football team would play its home games at Ebbetts Field and that they had signed Mal Stevens as head coach and Glenn Dobbs and Bill Daley to play in the backfield.

Stevens resigned as the Dodgers head coach in October 1946 after the team posted a 1–4–1 record in its first six games. Assistant coach Tom Scott took over on an interim basis after Stevens' resignation. Cliff Battles was hired as the new head coach on November 1, 1946.

The team's statistical leaders included halfback Glenn Dobbs with 1,886 passing yards, 208 rushing yards, and end Saxon Judd with 443 receiving yards. Dobbs and guard/fullback Phil Martinovich tied for the team scoring lead with 36 points each. Dobbs' total of 1,886 passing yards also led the AAFC.

Schedule

Division standings

Roster
Players shown in bold started at least one game at the position listed as confirmed by contemporary game coverage.

References

Brooklyn Dodgers (AAFC) seasons
Brooklyn Dodgers
Brooklyn Dodgers AAFC
1940s in Brooklyn
Flatbush, Brooklyn